Gianluca Gaudenzi (born 28 December 1965 in Riccione) is an Italian professional football coach and a former player, who played as a midfielder.

Career
After playing for plethora Italian clubs in the lower divisions, he made his Serie A debut with Verona in 1989, and later moved to Milan in 1990, where he won the UEFA Super Cup and the Intercontinental Cup during his only season with the club, under manager Arrigo Sacchi. He transferred to Serie A side Cagliari in 1991, where he remained until 1993. He subsequently played for several more Italian clubs in the lower divisions, until his retirement in 1999.

He began his coaching career with Serie D side Fano in 2001, but as of 2011, has remained inactive after being fired from Fano during the 2011–12 Lega Pro season.

Honours

Player
Milan
 UEFA Super Cup winner: 1990.
 Intercontinental Cup winner: 1990.

References

External links
 Gianluca Gaudenzi at playmakerstats.com (English version of calciozz.it)

1965 births
Living people
Italian footballers
Serie A players
Serie B players
Serie C players
Rimini F.C. 1912 players
Brescia Calcio players
A.C. Ancona players
U.S. Livorno 1915 players
Delfino Pescara 1936 players
A.C. Monza players
Hellas Verona F.C. players
A.C. Milan players
Cagliari Calcio players
S.S.D. Lucchese 1905 players
Modena F.C. players
A.C. Cesena players
Italian football managers
Aurora Pro Patria 1919 managers
A.S.D. Calcio Ivrea managers
Association football midfielders
F.C. Pro Vercelli 1892 managers